North Country School (also called NCS) is an independent junior boarding and day school for boys and girls in grades four through nine. Its 220-acre campus is located in Lake Placid, NY in the High Peaks Region of the 6 million acre Adirondack Park. North Country School’s campus includes a beach on Round Lake, a ski hill, gardens and a working farm. At the center of campus is the “Main Building,” which houses classrooms, a computer lab, dining room, Quonset gymnasium, art studios, dark room, music practice rooms, and administrative offices.  North Country School shares its property with Camp Treetops.

History 
Walter and Leonora Clark, both progressive educators, founded North Country School in 1938. The year the school opened, the Clarks’ six students and two teachers lived in Camp Treetops' buildings while the first school building was under construction. The property was owned by Mrs. Clark’s sister and brother-in-law, Helen and Douglas Haskell, who ran Camp Treetops starting in 1929 following its founding by Douglas Slesinger in 1921.  The Clarks envisioned a school that would extend Treetops’ ideals of “personal choice balanced by vibrant community” and “time outdoors for meaningful work, unstructured play and discovery” into classroom learning. Today, North Country School enrolls 90 students and offers a rigorous and progressive academic curriculum and opportunities for students to engage with the natural world, including: garden and farm projects, maple sugaring, chores, wilderness trips, and horseback riding.

Buildings and facilities 

Many buildings on the North Country School campus are considered to be architecturally significant.  Douglas Haskell (1899-1979), an American writer, architecture critic and noted champion of modern architecture in America, owned the property for over 40 years and designed many of the original buildings with their natural surroundings in mind.

The Main Building built in 1938 and expanded in 1946 owes its design to Douglas Haskell and Henry Churchill. It houses classrooms, a computer lab, dining room, Quonset gymnasium, art studios, dark room, music practice rooms, and administrative offices. Students live in family-style houses (opposed to dormitories). The campus has undergone recent upgrades including the construction of a Timber frame art and dance performance pavilion (2002), the construction of student residence Clark House (2010), the addition of a high-efficiency biomass heating plant (2013), and an award-winning renovation of an 1880s barn (2013).

Houses
Algonquin House – Harwell Hamilton Harris, 1967–68 (dorm)
Balcony House – Douglas Haskell, 1938 (dorm)
Bramwell House – Harwell Hamilton Harris, 1967–68 (dorm)
Cascade House – Harwell Hamilton Harris, 1967–68 (dorm)
Clark House – Stephen Tilly, 2010 (dorm)
Farm House – 1800s 
Glass House – Harwell Hamilton Harris, 1944
Mountain House – Harwell Hamilton Harris, 1967–68 (dorm)
Road House 
Woods House – Douglas Haskell, 1942 (dorm)

Additional Facilities
Art studios
Barns
Biomass heating plant
Greenhouses
Lean-tos 
Maple syrup boiling facility
Music rooms
Riding ring
Round Lake
Quonset gymnasium
Ski hill with many green, blue, glades skiing area, and a terrain park(rope tow as a lift).
Timber Frame pavilion

Academics
In addition to a traditional core curriculum with experiential learning in five subject areas plus foreign language and learning support, North Country School offers 27 studio arts and 17 performing arts classes.

Athletic Offerings
Alpine skiing
Basketball (team)
Equestrian (team)
Hiking
Ice climbing
Ice skating
Mountain biking
Nordic skiing (team)
Rock climbing
Snowboarding
Soccer (team)

Summer Program
North Country School shares a campus with Camp Treetops.  It also offers North Country Summer School (NCSS), an English language and American culture immersion program.

Governance
North Country School and Camp Treetops are governed by a 25-member Board of Trustees.  The school and camp are one 501 (c)(3) non-profit organization that receives charitable gifts from parents, friends and alumni/ae.

Notable alumni
Andrea Gruber (American dramatic soprano)
Adam Guettel (American composer-lyricist)
Yasmin Aga Khan (philanthropist)
David Loud (American musician and conductor)
Richard Rockefeller (physician, philanthropist)
Eileen Rockefeller Growald (author, philanthropist)
Matt Salinger (American actor)
Robel Teklemariam (Olympian)
Jessica Tuck (Actress)
David Sloan Wilson (American evolutionary biologist)

Memberships / Affiliations
National Association of Independent Schools (NAIS) 
Junior Boarding Schools Association (JBSA) 
The Association of Boarding Schools (TABS)

References

External links

Facebook
Junior Boarding School Association
National Association of Independent Schools
New York State Association of Independent Schools
The Association of Boarding Schools

1938 establishments in New York (state)
Educational institutions established in 1938
Lake Placid, New York
Private middle schools in New York (state)
Schools in Essex County, New York